Clarence Don Clark (April 16, 1851November 18, 1930) was an American teacher, lawyer, and politician from New York. He participated in the constitutional convention for Wyoming's statehood and was that state's first congressman. He served as both a United States representative and United States Senator.

Biography

Clark was born in Sandy Creek, New York to Oratia D. Clark and Laura A. (King) Clark. He attended the University of Iowa at Iowa City.
He studied law and was admitted to the bar in 1874. He was a teacher and practiced law in Manchester, Iowa. Clark married Alice Downs in 1874. In 1881, he moved to Evanston in the Wyoming Territory and continued the practice of law before becoming the county attorney of Uinta County, a job he held between 1882 and 1884.

In 1889, he began his political career as a delegate to the Wyoming constitutional convention. He was elected as a Republican to the United States House of Representatives for the Fifty-first United States Congress and was reelected to the Fifty-second United States Congress. He was one of the new state's first representatives. He remained in office two terms, from December 1, 1890, until March 3, 1893. He lost his bid for reelection in 1892.

He was elected as a United States senator in a special election to fill a vacancy in 1895 and was reelected to that seat three times,  serving from January 23, 1895, until March 3, 1917. After losing the election in 1916, he resumed the practice of law in Washington, D.C., but was appointed as a member of the International Joint Commission in 1919. He served as its chairman from 1923 until his retirement in 1929. After retirement, he moved back to Evanston, Wyoming where he lived until his death. Clark died on November 18, 1930, and is interred at the Masonic Cemetery in Evanston.

References

External links
 

 govtrack.us
 The Political Graveyard

People from Sandy Creek, New York
Iowa lawyers
Wyoming lawyers
1851 births
1930 deaths
University of Iowa College of Law alumni
Lawyers from Washington, D.C.
Republican Party United States senators from Wyoming
Republican Party members of the United States House of Representatives from Wyoming
People from Manchester, Iowa
People from Evanston, Wyoming